Major General Sir Robert John Swan Corbett,  (born 16 May 1940) was the last Commandant of the British Sector in Berlin.

Military career
Educated at Woodcote House School and Shrewsbury School, Corbett was commissioned into the Irish Guards in 1959. He became Commanding Officer of the 1st Battalion Irish Guards in 1981. He became Chief of Staff to British Forces in the Falkland Islands in 1984 and Commander 5th Airborne Brigade in 1985. He went on to be Director of Defence Programmes at the Ministry of Defence in 1987 and the last Commandant of the British Sector in Berlin prior to the German reunification in 1990. Finally he was appointed Major-General commanding the Household Division and General Officer Commanding London District in 1991. He retired in 1994.

In retirement he became Secretary of the Dulverton Trust, a national charity with priorities in youth and education.

Family
In 1966 he married Susan Margaret Anne O'Cock; they went on to have three sons.

References

 

|-
 

1940 births
Living people
People educated at Shrewsbury School
Knights Commander of the Royal Victorian Order
Companions of the Order of the Bath
Recipients of the Order of Merit of Berlin
Irish Guards officers
British Army major generals
People educated at Woodcote House School